The 2. Liga is the second-level football league in Slovakia. Currently, there are sixteen teams in one group of the competition. For two seasons, it was also known as DOXXbet liga for sponsorship reasons.

History
The league was formed as a second-tier league in Czechoslovakia. Before the dissolution of Czechoslovakia it consisted of 16 teams. Upon dissolution, six teams were promoted to the then newly formed Corgoň Liga. The league was expanded to 18 teams in 1996–97 season, but back to 16 in 2001–02 and 12 in 2006–07.

For 2014/2015 & 2015/2016 seasons the league became known as DOXXbet liga as part of a sponsorship agreement.

Current teams (2022–23)

 Dolný Kubín
 FK Dubnica
 FK Humenné
 KFC Komárno
 FC Košice
 FC Petržalka
 FK Pohronie
 Považská Bystrica
 MŠK Púchov
 FK Rača
 ŠTK 1914 Šamorín
 Slovan Bratislava U21
 Spartak Myjava
 Slavoj Trebišov
 Tatran Prešov
 Žilina B

Winners

 Bold denotes team earned promotion.
1FC VSS Košice did not meet club license rules and they went into bankruptcy

Performance by club

1- Inter Bratislava won league in 2008–09, but license was sold to FK Senica. 
2- FC VSS Košice won league in 2016–17, but did not meet club license rules and they went into bankruptcy

References

External links
Official website
2. liga on SFZ

 
2
Slovak